In mathematics, a simple subcubic graph (SSCG) is a finite simple graph in which each vertex has a degree of at most three.  Suppose we have a sequence of simple subcubic graphs G1, G2, ... such that each graph Gi has at most i + k vertices (for some integer k) and for no i < j is Gi homeomorphically embeddable into (i.e. is a graph minor of) Gj.

The Robertson–Seymour theorem proves that subcubic graphs (simple or not) are well-founded by homeomorphic embeddability, implying such a sequence cannot be infinite. So, for each value of k, there is a sequence with maximal length.  The function SSCG(k) denotes that length for simple subcubic graphs.  The function SCG(k) denotes that length for (general) subcubic graphs.

The SCG sequence begins SCG(0) = 6, but then explodes to a value equivalent to fε2*2 in the fast-growing hierarchy.

The SSCG sequence begins slower than SCG, SSCG(0) = 2, SSCG(1) = 5, but then grows rapidly.  SSCG(2) = 3 × 2(3 × 295) − 8 ≈ 3.241704 × 1035775080127201286522908640066 and its decimal expansion ends in ...11352349133049430008. SSCG(3) is much larger than TREE(3). SSCG(3) is in fact so large that it is bigger than TREE(TREE(TREE(TREE… (over TREE(3) times …TREE(TREE(TREE(TREE(3)…). 

Adam P. Goucher claims there is no qualitative difference between the asymptotic growth rates of SSCG and SCG. He writes "It's clear that SCG(n) ≥ SSCG(n), but I can also prove SSCG(4n + 3) ≥ SCG(n)."

See also 
Goodstein's theorem
Paris–Harrington theorem
Kanamori–McAloon theorem

Notes

References 

Mathematical logic
Theorems in discrete mathematics
Order theory
Wellfoundedness
Graph theory